Cloé Hache (born 11 December 1997) is a French swimmer. Hache was born in Nogent-sur-Marne, Paris. She competed in the women's 4 × 200 metre freestyle relay event at the 2016 Summer Olympics.

References

External links
 

1997 births
Living people
Olympic swimmers of France
Swimmers at the 2016 Summer Olympics
Swimmers from Paris
French female freestyle swimmers
20th-century French women
21st-century French women